The 1999 Legg Mason Tenis Classic was the 30th edition of this tennis tournament and was played on outdoor hard courts.  The tournament was part of the International Series of the 1999 ATP Tour. It was held at the William H.G. FitzGerald Tennis Center in Washington, D.C. from August 16 through August 22, 1999.

Finals

Singles

 Andre Agassi defeated  Yevgeny Kafelnikov, 7–6(7–3), 6–1
 It was Agassi's 3rd title of the year and the 42nd of his career. It was his 5th title at the event, also winning in 1990, 1991, 1995 and 1998.

Doubles

 Justin Gimelstob /  Sébastien Lareau defeated  David Adams /  John-Laffnie de Jager, 7–5, 6–7(2–7), 6–3

References

External links
 ATP tournament profile

Legg Mason
Washington Open (tennis)
1999 in sports in Washington, D.C.
1998 in American tennis